Zeta is a small neotropical genus of potter wasps currently containing 4 species. Three of them have restricted distributions: Zeta confusum is found only in Cuba; Zeta abdominale is spread through several Caribbean Islands (Jamaica, Hispaniola, Puerto Rico, Virgin Islands and Antigua, with three presently recognized subspecies) and Zeta mendozanum is restricted to the Monte and Patagonia regions of Argentina. Zeta argillaceum, on the other hand, is a very common, widespread and variable species found in the continental Americas from the southern United States (where it was probably introduced) to central Argentina. The wide range of color variation of this species has led to the recognition of a number of subspecies and varieties currently treated as simple synonyms.

References

 Giordani Soika, A. 1975. Sul genere Zeta (Sauss.). Boll. Mus. Civ. Stor. Nat. Venezia 27: 111–135.
 Carpenter, J.M. 2003. Return to the subspecies concept in the genus Zeta. Boletín del Museo Nacional de Historia Natural del Paraguay 14 : 19 - 24.

Gallery 

Biological pest control wasps
Potter wasps